Opportunity gap can refer to:
in business, a market opportunity that a company or individual is not addressing
in politics, a euphemism for a lack of equal opportunity

See also
Business opportunity
Market intelligence
Marketing management
Marketing plan
Product management
Strategic planning
Achievement gap
Digital gap
Generation gap
Income gap
Marriage gap